Magnesium oil (also referred to as transdermal magnesium, magnesium hexahydrate) is a compound of magnesium chloride dissolved in six molecules of water, with magnesium as the alkaline earth metal and chlorine as the nonmetal. In reality, it is not a "true" oil, as it is not composed of one or more hydrocarbons. Magnesium oil is actually magnesium chloride hexahydrate . Magnesium oil can be applied to the skin as an alternative to taking a magnesium supplement by mouth, and it is claimed to have health benefits, such as for the treatment of magnesium deficiency, to relieve muscle pain and ache (especially headaches), and to enhance relaxation. However, such use has been described as "scientifically unsupported" due to lack of any convincing data that magnesium is absorbed in significant amounts through the skin. It can also be found as a spray for the mentioned purposes. Magnesium is used in over 600 cellular reactions within the human body, including the immune system. Magnesium oil, with a chemical formula of  has a formula mass of 203.30 g/mol.

Synthesis
When magnesium (Mg) reacts with one molecule of chlorine, the magnesium chloride salt is forming. The electron deficient magnesium has a potential for further reactions to become stable. Dissolving this chemical, magnesium chloride, in six molecules of water results in the successful synthesis of "magnesium oil." The formation of magnesium oil,  is depicted below:

Process of isolation 

Past applications 
Transdermal drug absorption has been part of human history for centuries from the time ancient Egyptians among other started using saunas. Magnesium delivered through the skin aids as a muscle relaxant and skin rejuvenation. Transdermal application of magnesium oil has been more popular than magnesium pills due to the ability of the oil to directly circulate through the bloodstream after its administration using skin-adhesive patches.

Toxicology 
Those with kidney problems are advised to avoid using magnesium oil.

References

Further reading 
 Mendelson-Mastey, Chani, et al. "Synthesis of magnesium chloride nanoparticles by the water/oil nanoemulsion evaporation." Colloids and Surfaces A: Physicochemical and Engineering Aspects 529 (2017): 930–935.

Magnesium
Biology and pharmacology of chemical elements